Sikkim Republican Party (SRP) is a regional political party (State Party (Unrecognized)) in the Indian state of Sikkim. Founder and incumbent president is Kharka Bahadur Rai (K.B. Rai). Election symbol is Flute.

History 
On February 27, 2017, K.B. Rai launched a new political party, Sikkim Republican Party (SRP) at Jorethang, South Sikkim. K.B. Rai is former President of Sikkim Gorkha Jagaran Sangh which advocates the expansion of the interests for Gorkha ethnic group of Sikkim.

On February 22, 2019, SRP was allotted the flute as party's symbol by ECI for the 2019 Sikkim Legislative Assembly Election (32 constituencies). In April same year, SRP nominated 12 candidates from 13 constituencies for this election. But all candidates lost and only received 1.51% votes or less in each constituency. In Lok Sabha Election 2019 in Sikkim, SRP nominated Dhiraj Kumar Rai as its candidate, but he lost and secured only 1,503 votes (0.43%) and the 7th position of 11 candidates.

In the September same year By-Election for Sikkim Legislative Assembly (3 constituencies), SRP send candidates to all 3 constituencies. But all candidates lost and only received 1.94% votes or less in each constituency.

Electoral records 
 Sikkim Legislative Assembly election

 Lok Sabah election, Sikkim

References

External links
 Sikkim Republican Party (Facebook)

Political parties in Sikkim
Political parties established in 2017
2017 establishments in Sikkim